The Carrus Tauranga Open is an annual 72-hole golf tournament staged at Tauranga Golf Club in Gate Pa, Tauranga, New Zealand. In 2006 and 2007 it was an event on the Golf Tour of New Zealand while events since 2008 have been part of the Charles Tour.

There have been three rounds of 59 in the event. Richard Lee made one in 2010, while Mark Brown has made two, in 2014 and 2018.

Winners

Notes

References

Golf tournaments in New Zealand